Swimming events at the 2017 Canada Summer Games were held in Winnipeg, Manitoba at the Pan Am Pool from August 7 to August 12. There were 67 events of swimming at these games. The Canada Games are a youth competition, the age restrictions for swimming at the 2017 Canada Summer games restricted competition to males born in 2001 or later and females born in 2002 or later. This effectively made the games a 16 under male competition or 15 and under female competition for able bodied swimmers.

Results

Men's

50m freestyle

100m freestyle

200m freestyle

400m freestyle

800m freestyle

1,500m freestyle

50m backstroke

100m backstroke

200m backstroke

Women's

50m freestyle

100m freestyle

200m freestyle

400m freestyle

800m freestyle

1,500m freestyle

50m backstroke

100m backstroke

200m backstroke

50m breaststroke

100m breaststroke

200m breaststroke

50m butterfly

100m butterfly

200m butterfly

200m medley

400m medley

400m medley

4 × 50m freestyle relay

4 × 100m freestyle relay

4 × 200m freestyle relay

4 × 50m medley relay

4 × 100m medley relay

5,000m open water

References

2017 Canada Summer Games
2017 in swimming
2017 Canada Games